Martín Galeano (?, Valencia del Mombuey, Badajoz, Spain - ?, Vélez, New Kingdom of Granada) was a Spanish conquistador of Genovese descent who is known as the founder of the towns of Vélez, Oiba and Charalá in Santander, Colombia. He took part in the expedition of the Spanish conquest of the Muisca led by Gonzalo Jiménez de Quesada. After the foundation of Bogotá, he was sent northwards into Guane territories.

Biography 
Martín Galeano was born in Valencia del Mombuey, Badajoz or Genoa and had one brother, Pedro Galeano, and one sister, Ángela Jiménez Galeano. He married twice: with an unnamed woman; and with Isabel Juan de Meteller, formerly married to Pedro Ortuño Royo. With the unnamed woman, Galeano had one daughter; Marina, or Martina, Galeano, who became an encomendera.

Conquest by Martín Galeano

Gallery

See also 

 List of conquistadors in Colombia
 Spanish conquest of the Muisca
 El Dorado
 Spanish conquest of the Guane, Hernán Pérez de Quesada
 Gonzalo Jiménez de Quesada, Guane, Vélez

References

Bibliography

Further reading 
 

Year of birth unknown
Year of death unknown
16th-century Spanish people
16th-century explorers
Spanish conquistadors
Extremaduran conquistadors
Spanish city founders
Encomenderos
History of the Muisca
History of Colombia